James Everett Johnston (April 16, 1917 – November 17, 1973) was an American football player who played professionally in the National Football League (NFL) for the Washington Redskins and the Chicago Cardinals. Born in Parma, Idaho, he played high school football at Caldwell and college football at the University of Washington in Seattle. Johnston was selected in the tenth round of the 1939 NFL Draft by the Redskins with the 88th overall pick.

References

External links
 

1917 births
1973 deaths
American football ends
American football running backs
Chicago Cardinals players
Washington Huskies football players
Washington Redskins players
People from Caldwell, Idaho
People from Parma, Idaho
Players of American football from Idaho